The Prids are an American post-punk/indie rock band based in Portland, Oregon, led by former couple David Frederickson and Mistina La Fave. AllMusic described them as specializing in "a moody form of indie rock influenced by '80s college radio stalwarts",. and their influences include the Smiths, Unrest, the Jesus and Mary Chain, Built to Spill, Wire and Sonic Youth.

The Prids are known for following a strong DIY ethic, including the home recording of several of their records, booking their own tours and running their own Portland label collective, This-a-Way Records.

History 
The Prids were founded in the small town of St. Joseph, Missouri, in 1995 by Frederickson (guitar, vocals) and La Fave (bass, vocals). The band name was a reference to a pet name that Frederickson had for La Fave. The group continued to develop in Omaha and Lincoln, Nebraska, and in Lincoln, they befriended Harry Dingman III, guitarist of 1980s post-punk band For Against.
 
After adding Jairus Smith (drums) and Trenor Rapkins (keyboards), the band relocated to Portland in November 1999, and released their debut EP, Duracraft, in 2000 on the Death Tech Music label, featuring cover artwork by Dingman. In a contemporaneous live review, the Portland Mercury described the Prids as: "Imagine if My Bloody Valentine and New Order decided to collaborate when they were both at their peaks".

Their second EP, Glide, Screamer, was self-released in 2002. Drummer Lee Zeman replaced Smith for their debut full-length album, Love Zero, released on May 6, 2003, by Luminal Records. In 2004 Eric Hold replaced Smith, and the band released two 7-inch singles on Luminal: "Let It Go" and "Shadow and Shadow". In 2005, the band added drummer Joey Maas, replacing Zeman.

The Prids signed with New York-based label Five03 Records, who released a second album, ...Until the World Is Beautiful (August 29, 2006) and a third EP, Something Difficult (October 9, 2007). Hold then left the band, replaced by Maile Arruda.

On July 20, 2008, the Prids were involved in a serious highway accident while driving south from San Francisco to Los Angeles. All four members and two of their significant others were injured to varying degrees, and their van and gear were destroyed. In the aftermath of the accident, fans and friends worldwide donated over $16,000 to help the band with medical bills and equipment costs, and Five03 released a digital-only benefit/tribute album, Dots to Connect: The Music of the Prids, featuring Prids covers by A Place to Bury Strangers, the Suffocation Keep (with Brett Nelson of Built to Spill), The Upsidedown, Entertainment, Helvetia (band) and others.

In 2009, the Prids issued the song "Break" on a split single with Lookbook. The band's third album, Chronosynclastic, featuring guest guitar from Doug Martsch of Built to Spill, was released on the Velvet Blue Music label on June 11, 2010.

In 2015, the Prids (with drummer Gordon Nickel and keyboardist Cass Yates replacing Zeman and Arruda)  celebrated their 20th anniversary as a band, and announced plans to release a fourth album.

Members
 David Frederickson - guitar, vocals (1995–present)
 Mistina La Fave - bass, vocals (1995–present)
 Gordon Nickel - drums (2013–present)
 Cass Yates - keyboards, bass (2014–present)

Former members
 Trenor Rapki - keyboards (1998-2001)
 Jairus Smith - drums, keyboards (1998-2004)
 Lee Zeman - drums (2002-2005, 2009-2015)
 Eric Hold - keyboards (2004-2007)
 Joey Maas - drums (2005- 2009)
 Maile Arruda - keyboards (2007-2015)

Discography

Studio albums
Love Zero (2003, Luminal Records; 2006, This-A-Way Records)
...Until the World Is Beautiful (2006, Five03 Records)
Chronosynclastic (2010, Velvet Blue Music; 2011, This-A-Way Records)
Do I Look Like I'm In Love? (2018, This-A-Way Records)

EPs
Duracraft (2000, Death Tech Music)
Glide, Screamer (2002, self-released)
Something Difficult (2007, Five03 Records)

Singles
"Let It Go" 7-inch (2004, Luminal Records)
"Shadow and Shadow" 7-inch (2004, Luminal Records)
"Something Difficult" 7-inch (2008, Catastrophe Ballet)
"Break" split 7-inch with Lookbook (2009, Poison Apple Records)

Compilation appearances
"Persona Solara" on Portland Mercury Presents Compact Disc of Sound (2001, Portland Mercury)
"Contact" on New Dark Age Vol. 2 (2004, Strobelight Records)
"The Problem" on Dark Awakening Vol. 5 (2006, COP International)
"One Thousand Five" on A Compilation of Portland Music Volume 5 (2008, Failing Records)
"Fragile" on Songs From a Sonic Land (2010, Reverb Records)
"I'm Sorry" on Friends and Acquaintances (2013, Cassingle and Loving It) 
"Lie Here" on "Portland Cream Vol.1" (2016, Voodoo Doughnut Recordings)
"Adore" on Got That Feeling, a Tribute to Skywave (2015, The Blog That Celebrates Itself Records)

Tribute albums
Dots to Connect: The Music of the Prids (2009, Five03 Records)

References

External links
 The Prids official site
 The Prids label This-A-Way Records
 Velvet Blue Music Prids page

American post-rock groups
Indie rock musical groups from Oregon
Musical groups from Portland, Oregon
Musical groups established in 1995
1995 establishments in Oregon